Heendeniya Vidanaralalage Punya Heendeniya (born 31 July 1938), popularly as Punya Heendeniya, is a former Sri Lankan cinema actress who currently resides in England.

Personal life
Punya Heendeniya was born on 31 July 1938 in Mirigama, Sri Lanka as the fifth child in a family with seven siblings. Her father M. A. Hindeniya was a land owner and planter in Mirigama. Her mother, D. L. Kahawitage was from Panadura. She was first educated at Mirigama Primary School (currently known as Dudley Senanayake College). She went to Mirigama Maha Vidyalaya after the age of six to study in English medium. She was also a member of the school netball team.

The pirivena where the Mahanayake Thero of the Sri Lanka Ramanna Nikaya now resides was separated by a wall in front of the Mirigama Mahagedara where she lived as a child. The late Ven. Medhankara Nayaka Thero, who was the Chief Incumbent at that time, was a close relative of the Punya's father. Punya has three elder sisters: Daya, Sheela, Ramya, one elder brother, Weerawardhana and two younger brothers: Amara and Karunasinghe. Ramya Heendeniya acted in the film Kurulu Bedda with Punya, and was the mother of journalist and writer Pushkara

 Wanniarachchi and teledrama editor Sameera Wanniarachchi. Weerawardhana was a music instructor. Renowned poet P. K. D. Seneviratne is also a paternal relative of Punya.

She married Dr. Milroy Nanayakkara and had two children with her husband, they also have six grandchildren. After the marriage, she left the cinema and settled in England. Her son Anupama Nanayakkara is a specialist doctor. When Anupama was a child, he came to Sri Lanka in 1982 at the invitation of the Lester James Peiris and acted as the son of Nanda 
and Piyal in the film Kaliyugaya. Punya's daughter, Purnami is a doctor.

Career
Since school times, she excelled dancing. She was lucky enough to learn dancing under renowned dancer S. Panibharatha. Then Punya got to play the lead role in the ballet Ditti Mangalika staged by Panibharatha at school. She also learned music under her school master, S. D. David Appuhamy. For her acting and musical talents, she was assisted by the college principal K. A. Pannaratne. Panibharatha was assigned to do a dance performance in Sirisena Wimalaweera's film Asoka where Punya had the opportunity to perform in that dance item.

Then she went to the office of Heladiva Art Company in front of the Jethavanaramaya Temple on Armor Street, Colombo to meet the film production lawyer Somaratne who searched a fresh face for the latest film Deyyange Rate. After seeing her, Somaratne introduced Punya to Tamil director Ramachandran. At once, they selected Punya for the lead role 'Katherina' in the film. The film became highly popular and made her turning point in the cinema career. After the film, she acted in the films Sri 296 and Suneetha where the shooting was done in India. Then in 1961, she played the lead role of blockbuster film Kurulu Bedda. After Kurulu Bedda, Punya starred in the film Sikuru Tharuwa with the lead role.

John Amaratunga, the producer of the Sikuru Tharuwa came in search of Punya and informed that she has been selected for the lead role in the film Gameperaliya directed by Lester James Peries. She received several awards for his critics acclaimed role in the film. In 1968, she won the award for the Best Actress at 5th Sarasaviya Awards for her role in the film Ransalu. Although she gave up acting in 1968, at the peak of her career, she made comeback in the film Kaliyugaya in 1983 for which she received a merit award at Presidential Film Awards. In 2013 Sumathi Awards, she was honored with U.W. Sumathipala Memorial award.

Filmography

Awards
1964- Eksath Rasika Sangamaya Best Actress Award, Gamperaliya
1964- Sarasaviya Film Awards- Best Actress Award, Best film, Gamperaliya
1964- Best Actress Proficiency Award, Sikuru Tharuwa
1965 Gamperaliya won "Golden Peacock Award" Grand Prix International Film Festival of India, New Delhi
1965 Gamperaliya won "Golden Head of Palenque", Resena Mundial Film Festival in Acapulco, Mexico
1965- Punya Heendeniya represented Sri Lanka on World Human Rights Day at the United Nations Headquarters in New York.
1966 Swarana Sankha Award, Best Actress Award, Parasathumal
1968- Sarasaviya Film AwardsSarasaviya Best Actress Award- Best Actress Award, Ran Salu
1985- Presidential Award- Kaliyugaya.
1998- to Celebrate 50 years of Sri Lankan Cinema a Rs10 stamp depicting Gamperaliya was issued.
2000-Lifetime achievement, President's Golden Lion Award
2008-Gamperaliya (Changement au village) shown in Cannes Film Festival as restored Classics.
2013-U.W.Sumathipala Lifetime Achievement Award
2015- Special Signis Salutation Award, -the highest award given by Signis Sri Lanka for a person who has contributed much for the development of media in Sri Lanka.
2016 - Sarasaviya Abhimani (Legendary) Award.

References

External links 
 http://www.films.lk/ArtistDetails.php?id=1139 Punya Heendeniya on Sinhala Cinema Database
 http://www.sundaytimes.lk/090405/Magazine/sundaytimesmagazine_00.html
http://www.sundaytimes.lk/120624/plus/lesters-films-the-hallmark-of-a-humanist-4055.html

Living people
Sri Lankan film actresses
English people of Sri Lankan descent
20th-century Sri Lankan actresses
Place of birth missing (living people)
1938 births